Pervomayskoye (Üç-Avlaq) is a rural locality (a selo) in Kayakentsky District, Republic of Dagestan, Russia. The population was 8,930 as of 2010. There are 90 streets.

Geography 
Pervomayskoye is located 20 km northwest of Novokayakent (the district's administrative centre) by road. Sagasi-Deybuk and Izberbash are the nearest rural localities.

Nationalities 
Dargins live there.

References 

Rural localities in Kayakentsky District